The People's Republic of the Congo competed at the 1988 Summer Olympics in Seoul, South Korea.

Competitors
The following is the list of number of competitors in the Games.

Athletics

References

External links
 

Nations at the 1988 Summer Olympics
1988
Olympics